St. Mark's International School is an international Australian school located in Suan Luang District, Bangkok.

It is a Christian school and a member of Association of Christian Schools International (ACSI). It was established in 1999 as the first Australian international school in Thailand.

The school caters for students from Kindergarten to Year 12.  Students come from a range of countries including Australia, England, New Zealand, the US, India, Singapore, Brazil, China, Japan and Thailand.

The schools offers an Australian and Singapore curriculum at primary level, and an IGCSE and A Level program in the secondary school. St. Mark's will be opening its second campus on Srinakarin Road in 2022.

References

External links

 St. Mark's International School Bangkok

Christian schools in Thailand
International schools in Bangkok
Educational institutions established in 1999
1999 establishments in Thailand